The Poker House, subsequently retitled as Behind Closed Doors, is a 2008 American independent drama film written and directed by Lori Petty, in her directorial debut. Based on Petty's early life during the 1970s, the film depicts a painful day in the life of Agnes (Jennifer Lawrence) a teenaged girl who is raising her two younger sisters, Bee (Sophi Bairley) and Cammie (Chloë Grace Moretz), in their mother's whorehouse.

The film received mixed reviews from critics, who praised the characters, writing and performances of the ensemble cast (particularly that of Lawrence) although the plot was criticized. At the Los Angeles Film Festival, Lawrence won an Outstanding Performance Award for her performance.

Plot
The film focuses on one single day in the life of three abused and neglected sisters, 14-year-old Agnes (Jennifer Lawrence), 12-year-old Bee (Sophi Bairley), and 8-year-old Cammie (Chloë Grace Moretz). Their mother, Sarah (Selma Blair), addicted to alcohol and drugs, has been coerced into prostitution to support her pimp, Duval (Bokeem Woodbine). Sarah is unable to care for the girls, forcing Agnes to take responsibility for her two younger sisters. Sarah's house has become known as the Poker House, where neighborhood pimps and criminals gather to play poker, as well as buying sex.

Agnes believes Duval is her boyfriend and that he loves her, despite being much older and his abuse towards her mother. Agnes wakes Bee and prepares her for her paper route. Cammie has stayed the night at her friend Sheila's house. It is revealed that before they left their father, who was a preacher, he used to beat Sarah and the girls. The four fled, and Sarah, struggling to take care of the girls on her own, became a prostitute after meeting Duval.

The day shifts from girl to girl. Little interaction occurs among the three. Bee speaks of moving into a foster home, hoping to be adopted. Cammie spends the day at a bar, making friends with Dolly (Natalie West), the bar owner, and Stymie (David Alan Grier), an alcoholic. Agnes rides through town, talking with a few friends, playing a game of basketball, and picking up a couple of paychecks from her part-time jobs. Towards the end of the day, Agnes climbs through Bee's window, avoiding the living room, which is full of gamblers, pimps, and drunks. Bee has locked herself in her room, and like Agnes, avoids the downstairs chaos. Agnes makes Bee leave the house, telling her not to come back for a while.

Later that evening after Duval and Agnes begin kissing, Duval then rapes her. As Duval releases her, she runs to the bathroom to clean herself, horrified by the thoughts of the violence and possibility of pregnancy. She is completely traumatized. Her mother enters the bathroom, and as Agnes reaches for her in utter distress, Sarah refuses to touch her, and instead tells Agnes to go to the store to pick up alcohol. Soon after, Agnes overhears Duval telling Sarah that he will begin pimping and selling Agnes. Agnes threatens to shoot Duval, firing a couple of shots and screaming to her mother that he raped her. Sarah tells Agnes that she will defend him.

Agnes, a school basketball star, scores 27 points in the second half alone, a record that lasts for years to come. However, she falls when she scores the last goal, limps to the car, and has a meltdown. She then drives off and finds Bee and Cammie at a nearby bridge. The two get in the car, with Agnes not telling her young sisters of events that took place that evening, and instead takes them to get dinner. Cammie then plays "Ain't No Mountain High Enough", and the movie closes as the three girls sing together.

At the start of the film credits, Agnes is revealed to have left Iowa to go to New York and become an actress and artist. Some 20 years later, she is shown to have directed the movie, revealing the movie is the true story of director Lori Petty's childhood.

Cast
Jennifer Lawrence as Agnes
Selma Blair as Sarah
Chloë Grace Moretz as Cammie
Bokeem Woodbine as Duval
David Alan Grier as Stymie
Danielle Campbell as Darla
Sophi Bairley as Bee
Casey Tutton as Sheila

Jennifer Lawrence's father, Gary Lawrence, appears uncredited in the film as the basketball coach of the other team.

Reception

Critical response
The Poker House has received mixed reviews from film critics. Review aggregator Rotten Tomatoes reports that 63% of critics have given the film a positive review based on eight reviews, with an average score of 6.2/10.

References

External links

2008 drama films
American coming-of-age drama films
2000s coming-of-age drama films
American independent films
2008 directorial debut films
2008 films
Films about prostitution in the United States
Films about rape
American films based on actual events
Films directed by Lori Petty
Films set in 1976
Films set in Iowa
Films shot in Chicago
2000s English-language films
2000s American films